Emma Jane Coburn (born October 19, 1990) is an American middle-distance runner who specializes in the 3000-meters steeplechase. She holds the distinction of being a world champion, world silver medalist, Olympic bronze medalist, three-time Olympian and 10-time US National Champion in the steeplechase.

At the 2017 World Championships in London, Coburn made history by taking gold thereby becoming the first American since 1952 to win a world steeplechase title. At the event she set a championship record of 9:02.58 and broke her own American record by five seconds.

She is a three-time Olympian making the US team in 2012, 2016 and 2020. At the 2016 Olympic Games in Rio she captured the bronze medal becoming the first American woman to medal in an Olympic steeplechase event.  Her finishing time of 9:07.63 established a then-new American record.

Her other steeplechase achievements include earning a silver medal at the 2019 World Championships in Doha, reaching the 2012 Olympic final (8th place), and competing in the World Championship finals in 2011 (10th) and 2015 (5th). She also won the 2014 IAAF Continental Cup and is a ten-time United States National Champion winning the event in each of the years she competed (2011, 2012, 2014-2019, 2021, 2022).

High school career
Coburn attended Crested Butte Community School. She was a multi-sport athlete competing in cross-country, volleyball, basketball and track. In 2007, when she was a junior in high school, she traveled to Albuquerque, New Mexico to run in an 800-meters event. While there her father encouraged Coburn to run in another event to make the six hour, 350 mile drive from her home worthwhile. However, because of schedule conflicts, the only event possible was the 2,000-meters steeplechase, which Coburn had never run before and knew little about. She won the race and qualified for the high school national meet. This serendipitous moment launched her steeplechase career.  In 2008, she ran 6:42 to finish second at the 2008 Nike Outdoor Nationals Track and Field Championships in the 2000-meters steeplechase.

College career
Coburn attended the University of Colorado from 2008-2013 where she was a three-time NCAA champion, capturing two steeplechase titles and one indoor mile title. She earned All-America honors six-times.

Coburn ran cross-country from 2008-2011. During her senior year in cross-country, she earned All-PAC-12 First Team, all-region, and All-America honors. She helped the Buffs win the inaugural PAC-12 title, tie for first place in the regional championships, and place 11th at NCAA National Cross-Country Championships. Her 20th place finish over the six-kilometer distance at the NCAA national cross-country championships contributed to her team's 11th-place finish, as she was Colorado's 2nd place runner in the event.

Coburn joined the track team in 2009 where she tried a number of disciplines during her first season including the indoor 1000-meters, outdoor 800-meters and the outdoor 1500-meters, before eventually concentrating on the steeplechase. She qualified for the NCAA Championships at Fayetteville in the steeplechase advancing to the final after running a then personal record (PR) of 10:06.21, which also doubled as the USA Junior record in the event. In the final, she ran 10:22.58 to finished 11th to cap off her first season.

In 2010, Coburn won the PAC-12 steeplechase title as a sophomore and finished second in the NCAA championships.

In 2011, as a junior, Coburn won both the PAC-12 indoor 3000-meters title and the PAC-12 3000-meters steeplechase title. She then went on to capture the NCAA 3000-meters steeplechase title. She also won the 2011 USA outdoor title in the steeplechase and made the US steeplechase team for the 2011 World Championships, finishing 12th in the final.

In 2012, Coburn did not compete for her collegiate team. She was redshirted and competed in track events as an unattached athlete so she could focus on the US Olympic Trials. In her first steeplechase of the 2012 season, Coburn became the fourth-fastest American in history and the fastest American on US soil with her time of 9:25.28. The time was a 12-second PR (personal record) for Coburn.

She qualified for the 2012 London Olympic Games in the 3000-meters steeplechase, joined in the event by her University of Colorado teammate, Shalaya Kipp. At age 21, Coburn was the youngest runner on the 2012 US Olympic team. In her Olympic debut, she placed third in her preliminary heat with a time of 9:27.51, automatically qualifying for the final. She came in ninth in the final, with a time of 9:23.54 – a then personal best.

In 2013, Coburn returned to the University of Colorado as a fifth-year senior. She was named the PAC-12 Track Athlete of the Week on April 30, 2013, after recording the best 3000-meters steeplechase time in the world for the season. On June 8, 2013, at the NCAA Championships at Hayward Field in Eugene, Oregon, Coburn ran the final race of her career where she would claim her second NCAA steeplechase title with a winning time of 9:35.38, finishing three seconds ahead of Florida State's Colleen Quigley.

Professional career

2013 
Following the completion of her collegiate career, Coburn announced that she was becoming a professional runner and, in June 2013, signed a contract with New Balance. Through a statement provided by the company, Coburn said, “I am thrilled to join Team New Balance as I start my professional career. New Balance has a long-standing history as an excellent running company and I am honored to become a part of it. I look forward to a bright future and partnership with Team New Balance." Right after signing with New Balance, Coburn announced that she had a sacral stress fracture that would cause her miss the 2013 World Championships in Moscow and require her to sit out the 2013 professional track season. The injury occurred during her final collegiate race.

2014 
In 2014, Coburn improved her 3000-meters steeplechase best four times. On May 18, at the Shanghai Diamond League meeting, she ran 9:19.81, earning her first Diamond League victory, before improving to 9:17.84 for third at Eugene in the Prefontaine Classic which was held on May 31. Four weeks later, Coburn ran 9:19.72 to win her third US title in Sacramento. On July 5, at the Paris Diamond League meeting, she ran a 9:14.12 for a second-place finish. This moved her to second on the US all-time list behind Jenny Simpson. One week later, on July 12 at the Diamond League meet in Glasgow, Scotland, she broke Simpson's American record of 9:12.51 by running 9:11.42 and finishing second in the race to Ethiopian Hiwot Ayalew. After that she ran two Diamond Discipline events finishing fifth in Stockholm in 9:20.31 and fifth in Zurich in 9:23.89. On September 14, Coburn topped off her most successful steeplechase season to-date winning the IAAF Track and Field 12th Continental Cup in Marrakesh, Morocco where she finished ahead of the world's number one steeplechase runner in 2014, Hiwot Ayalew. Bahrain's Ruth Jebet finished third.

2015 
In 2015, Coburn's indoor mile ranked 28th in the world. Coburn ran an Olympic qualifying time (1500m) of 4:05.1 in Eugene, Oregon, at the Prefontaine meet in May. She won the steeplechase at the 2015 USA Outdoor Track and Field Championships to qualify for the 2015 World Championships in Athletics, where she placed fifth.

2016 
In 2016, Coburn opened her outdoor season running 4:06.92 in the 1500 meters at Hoka One One Middle Distance Classic hosted at Occidental College. She set a new American record shortly thereafter at the Prefontaine Classic at Hayward Field, where she ran 9:10.76 in the 3000 meters steeplechase. Coburn broke the American record for a third time, earning bronze in 9:07.63 in the 2016 Olympic steeplechase and becoming the first American woman to win an Olympic medal in the 3000 meters steeplechase. Coburn placed ninth in 4:23.8 at the 2016 Fifth Avenue Mile.

On December 2, 2016, Coburn announced on her Twitter account that she was ending training with coaches Heather Burroughs and Mark Wetmore after "an amazing 8 years." She later began coaching under Joe Bashaard, her then-fiancé.

2017 
In January, Coburn, along with Sydney McLaughlin, Brenda Martinez, and Jenny Simpson set a world-best time of 10:40.31 in the Distance Medley Relay (DMR) at the 2017 New Balance Indoor Grand Prix at Boston's Reggie Lewis Center. Although news accounts reported it as" breaking a world record," the DMR was not recognized for world record sanctioning in 2017 by World Athletics because it was run on an indoor, banked track, rather than outdoors. Nevertheless, it was a remarkable feat with the US track community continuing to acknowledge it as a world record. Coburn ran the opening leg (1200m, 3:18.40), followed by Powell (400m, 52.32), then Martinez (800m, 2:01.94), with Simpson anchoring the team (1600m, 4:27.66). The previous best of 10:42.57 was run at this meeting in 2015 by the American team of Sarah Brown, Mahogany Jones, Megan Krumpoch, and Brenda Martinez.

On May 5, 2017, Coburn opened her outdoor season at the IAAF Diamond League 2017 Doha Qatar Athletic Super Grand Prix, racing the steeplechase in 9:14 to place 5th. She then took gold in the 2017 World Championships on August 11 in London. This championship made her the first American woman to win a gold medal in the steeplechase at either the World Championships or the Olympics. Four of the Kenyan-born women she beat in that race, including Olympic champion/world record holder Ruth Jebet had previously run faster than Coburn. Courtney Frerichs won a silver medal at the same event, thus making Coburn and Frerichs the first Americans to win the gold and silver medal in any individual World Championships or Olympics race longer than 400 meters since the 1912 Stockholm Games.

In November 2017, Coburn was named the winner of the prestigious Jackie Joyner-Kersee Award given annually by USATF to the top female athlete of the year, their highest accolade. Coburn joined the ranks of previous winners such as Joan Benoit, Gail Devers, Florence Griffith-Joyner, Jackie Joyner-Kersee, Lynn Jennings, Deena Kastor and Allyson Felix. In a statement, Coburn said, “I'm so honored to be named the Jackie Joyner-Kersee award winner and feel very fortunate to be among the athletes that have won this award in the past. All of the nominees were incredibly deserving, and I was motivated and inspired by their performances all year. Thank you to the media and fans who voted for me. I am grateful every day for the support I receive and am encouraged by it to push harder. This is truly an unexpected honor.”

2018 
In January 2018, Coburn opened her indoor season at Western State Colorado University, where she ran a then Colorado state record mile (at 7717 feet elevation) (since broken by Dani Jones on February 3, 2018, 4:36.05-mile in the University of Colorado's Indoor Practice Facility at 5430 feet elevation). Coburn followed her mile victory with a pair of 3000 meters races, first on February 3 at the Millrose Games in 8:41.16, a runner-up finish to teammate Aisha Praught-Leer who ran 8:41.10, and then at the New Balance Indoor Grand Prix on February 10, 2018, at the Reggie Lewis Center where her time of 8:43.57 placed 4th. Coburn finished 3rd in the 3000 meters at the 2018 USA Indoor Track and Field Championships behind winner Shelby Houlihan and runner-up Katie Mackey.

2019 
On June 30, 2019, she ran 9:04.90 to place second behind world record-holder Beatrice Chepkoech in the star-studded Diamond League steeplechase event at the Prefontaine Classic held in Stanford, California. On July 28, Coburn ran 9:25.63 at the 2019 USA Track & Field Outdoor Championships. Since she was the defending World Champion from 2017, she already was an automatic qualifier for the 2019 World Championships. Second was U.S. record-holder Courtney Frerichs, who ran 9:26.61, and also qualified to run in Doha, Qatar in September.

2020 
Coburn opened her 2020 season on January 25 at the New Balance Indoor Grand Prix in Boston, MA finishing third in the Indoor Two-Mile event in 9:32.81. At the same event she also ran in a 3000-meters Split-Time event posting a time of 8:56.60. While in Boston, on February 1, she appeared at the Bruce Lehane Scarlet & White Invitational at Boston University where she and fellow New Balance runner and training partner, Aisha Praught-Leer, provided ideal pacing for Cory McGee in the 1500-meters and for Emily Lipari in the 5000-meters. Coburn helped Lipari through the first 4,000 meters, who then went on to set a world leading and personal-best time of 15:07.44, elevating Lipari to eighth fastest in US history. McGee's, with Coburn's help, finished in 4:04.75 moving her to No. 3 in the world in the women's 1500-meters.

In March, Coburn finished fourth with a time of 1:25:37 at the Kaiser Permanente Napa Valley Half-Marathon. Later that month the effects of the global, COVID-19 pandemic triggered a severe social and economic disruption that also impacted the sports world. Local and international track and field events were cancelled or postponed including the upcoming 2020 Tokyo Summer Olympic Games and various international Diamond League events causing Coburn to reevaluate the remainder of her schedule.

On June 27, Coburn ran a 4:32.72 to establish a new Colorado soil record for the One Mile at the Team Boss event in Grand Junction, CO. The previous record stood at 4:36. The event helped raise money for a local charity, the Sachs Foundation. One month later, on July 26, running in the one-mile event at the Team Boss Indiana Mile held at Indiana Wesleyan University in Marion, Coburn ran a personal best of 4:23.65 moving her to 11th place on the US All-Time Fastest Outdoor Mile list.

In August she ran a 4:03.82 in the 1500-meters at the Music City Distance Classic in Nashville where she finished second. A week later Coburn closed out her season in Los Angeles at the Under Armour Sunset Tour finishing third in 2:01.10 in the 800-meters and then, along with Cory McGee, provided pacing in the 5000 meters event.

2021 
In June 2021 Coburn qualified for her third Olympic Games by finishing first in the 3000 meters steeplechase at the US Olympic Trials in Eugene, OR with a winning time of 9:09:41.  At the Tokyo Olympics she placed 14th in the final held on August 4, 2021; however, on the bell lap she clipped a barrier causing her to tumble off the track. She was later disqualified for touching the track's delimiting railing when she fell. Congratulating fellow American silver medalist Courtney Frerichs, she posted "Hugs in victory and defeat. Always appreciate this friendship and the constant effort required to be excellent together," while also having expressed her frustration at her own performance saying, "My Tokyo Olympic race was a total failure. I was terrible. Disappointed to not be my best and represent my country and team well. Thank you for all the kind words of support."

2022 
Coburn opened her 2022 season on May 19 competing in the 1500-meters at the USATF Distance Classic in Walnut CA where she ran a 4:09.47 finishing in 11th place. She next competed in the steeplechase at the Prefontaine Classic in Eugene, Oregon on May 28 coming in 8th with a time of 9:18.09. On June 11, she raced at the Portland Track Festival where she finished 3rd in the 1500-meters with a time of 4:04.44, but posted a DNF in the 5000-meters event.

During June 24-26th she competed in the steeplechase at the 2022 Toyota USATF Outdoor Championship where she ran 9:10.63 finishing first and capturing her 10th US National Champion title. During a post-race interview Coburn became emotional when asked to reflect upon which national championship was her favorite. Coburn stated that perhaps the 10th title is her most favorite because it made up for a deeply disappointing performance at the 2020 Tokyo Olympic Games and because she was unsure how many more races she would be able to enjoy with her mother, who has been battling cancer. Coburn thanked her family, sponsors and fans who have supported her over a professional career that has spanned nearly a decade.

From July 16-20th, Coburn competed in her fifth World Athletics Championships held in Eugene, Oregon, finishing eighth in the 3000-meters steeplechase final in 9:16.49.

Following the World Championships, in August and September, she ran three Diamond Discipline steeplechase events. She finished 4th at the Herculis EBS in Monaco posting a time of 9:07.93; 8th at the Memorial van Damme in Bruxelles with a run of 9:14.43; and 7th at the Diamond League Championships in Zurich with a time of 9:20.00.

On September 11, 2022, the 31-year-old World Champion and Olympic Bronze medalist ran in the New Balance 5th Avenue Mile in New York City finishing in 4:22.8, placing her 10th amongst the women professional runners, first in her age category (31-34) and 59th overall (both men and women). Great Britain's Laura Muir ran 4:14.8 to capture the win, Nikki Hiltz was second at 4:17.4 and Eleanor Fulton came in third in 4:18.0.

2023
On February 4, Coburn opened her 2023 season competing in the Women’s Mile at the New Balance Indoor Grand Prix in Boston, Massachusetts. The elite, international, indoor event is part of the 2023 World Athletics Indoor Tour Gold Meetings. Starting in the outside alley in 12th position, Coburn finished seventh with a time of 4:28.84. In doing so she posted a personal best eclipsing her previous PB for the indoor mile of 4:29.86, which she set during her 2012/2013 collegiate career.  The race saw six other runners post personal best while another two runners posted new national records. Heather MacLean of the US crossed the line in first place with a PB and world leading time of 4:23.42. With En Route timing being used in the same event, Coburn also posted an indoor personal best for the 1500 meters covering the distance in 4:10.39.   

On February 18, Coburn joined Team USA and traveled to Bathurst, New South Wales, Australia to participate in the 2023 World Athletics Cross Country Championships. Coburn, along with Alec Basten, Jordan Mann, and Heather MacLean formed Team USA’s Mixed Relay team, which finished fifth in 24:32.  Coburn ran the second leg in the race and improved Team USA’s overall position from tenth to fifth position by finishing her leg in 6:13. It was the first time since college that Coburn, whose professional track career has been focused on individual achievement, ran in a team event. The race was won by Team Kenya in 23:14, with Ethiopia taking silver in 23:21 and Australia earning the bronze medal in 23:26.

On February 23, Coburn took part in the Maurie Plant Meet  in Melbourne, Australia, competing in the 1500 meters where she ran a 4:10.96  to finish fifth. According to the meet organizers, Athletics Australia, "The event is part of The Continental Tour Gold series, which ranks in the uppermost level on the World Athletics Continental Tour calendar, sitting just under the Diamond League in status."

Competition record

USA National Championships

Personal bests
All sourced from worldathletics.org unless otherwise noted. As of February 4, 2023.

Season bests 
All sourced from worldathletics.org unless otherwise noted.

— No competition record

Personal life
In October 2017, Coburn married coach Joe Bosshard. Together, the couple organized the annual Elk Run 5k, a fundraising effort for the Crested Butte Cancer Support Community.

References

External links

 
 
 
 Emma Coburn at All-Athletics 
 
 
 

Living people
1990 births
American female middle-distance runners
American female steeplechase runners
Athletes (track and field) at the 2012 Summer Olympics
Athletes (track and field) at the 2016 Summer Olympics
Athletes (track and field) at the 2020 Summer Olympics
Sportspeople from Boulder, Colorado
Colorado Buffaloes women's track and field athletes
Colorado Buffaloes women's cross country runners
World Athletics Championships athletes for the United States
Medalists at the 2016 Summer Olympics
Olympic bronze medalists for the United States in track and field
World Athletics Championships medalists
World Athletics Championships winners
Track and field athletes from Colorado
University of Colorado Boulder alumni
USA Outdoor Track and Field Championships winners
IAAF Continental Cup winners
20th-century American women
21st-century American women